Hashimov is a surname. Notable people with the surname include:

 Hikmat Hashimov (born 1979), Uzbek footballer
 Polad Hashimov, Azerbaijani general and military hero
 Rafig Hashimov (born 1966), Azerbaijani journalist
 Zaur Hashimov, Azerbaijani footballer

See also
 Gashimov
 Hasanov